Concert de Gaudí is a concerto for classical guitar and orchestra by the American composer Christopher Rouse. The work was jointly commissioned by Norddeutscher Rundfunk and the Dallas Symphony Orchestra for the guitarist Sharon Isbin, with additional contributions from Richard and Jody Nordlof, to whom the piece is dedicated. It was completed August 1, 1999 and premiered in Hamburg, January 2, 2000, with Isbin and the Norddeutscher Rundfunk Orchester led by conductor Christoph Eschenbach. The piece was later awarded the 2002 Grammy Award for Best Classical Contemporary Composition.

Composition

Structure
Concert de Gaudí has a duration of roughly 25 minutes and is composed in three movements:
Allegro
Largo sereno
Svolazzante

Influences
The piece was inspired by the work of the Spanish architect Antoni Gaudí, after whom the concerto is titled.  Rouse wrote of this inspiration in the score program notes, saying:

Instrumentation
Concert de Gaudí is scored for solo guitar and orchestra comprising two flutes (2nd doubling piccolo), two oboes, two clarinets, two bassoons, two French horns, two trumpets, three trombones, harp, celesta, timpani, three percussionists (tambourine, tenor drum, bass drum, castanets, wood block, rute, suspended cymbal, Chinese cymbal, triangle, tam-tam, xylophone, marimba, and antique cymbals), and strings.

Reception
Tim Smith of The Baltimore Sun lauded the work, writing, "From the first percussive measures, it's clear that flamenco is very much on Rouse's mind. He gives the guitar lots of flamenco riffs, propels much of the music with flamenco rhythms. Passionately lyrical melodies and a few big, juicy, traditional harmonic progressions also help to give the work an old-fashioned flavor. But the composer adds plenty of his own spice to the mix, creating a concerto with a distinctive personality." Daniel Buckley of the Tucson Citizen wrote, "Quiet and reflective to spell-like and mysterious, the 1999 score features beautiful writing for both the solo instrument and the orchestra. The orchestration is intimate and exotic, yet direct and lovely in its tonal support." John Henken of the Los Angeles Times praised the balance of the piece and wrote, "In the first movement, that seemed to mean a collage of guitaristic gestures, more desultory than surreal.  The slow movement, though, is a haunted, brooding gem of texture and tune. The finale, with its bluesy bent notes and big cadenza, is the most overtly demonstrative."  Gramophone declared the piece to be "as spectacular and unconventional as its eponym’s cathedral in Barcelona" and added, "It is perhaps the most remarkable work yet written for guitar and orchestra."

Recordings
 Sharon Isbin, guitar, Gulbenkian Orchestra, Muhai Tang, conductor. Hamburg, Germany: Teldec New Line, 2001. Recorded live, May 2000, Gulbenkian Grand Auditorium, Lisbon.  Grammy Award in 2002 for Best Classical Contemporary Composition, and a 2002 Echo Klassik Award for Best Concert Recording.

References

Concertos by Christopher Rouse
1999 compositions
Guitar concertos
20th-century classical music
Music commissioned by the Dallas Symphony Orchestra
Music commissioned by Norddeutscher Rundfunk
Antoni Gaudí